Lophocampa affinis  is a moth of the family Erebidae. It was described by Walter Rothschild in 1909. It is found in Mexico.

Description

Male

Head and thorax blackish brown; the terminal half of tegulae whitish, the patagia whitish except at base and with black spot at middle; antenna; fulvous; femora yellow above; tibiae and tarsi with some whitish; abdomen yellow dorsally clothed with brown hair to near extremity, ventrally brown mixed with whitish. Forewing black brown irrorated with white; a white patch at base; an antemedial maculate white band, angled outwards at median nervure and followed by spots below costa and in and below cell; an oblique medial maculate white band from costa to above vein 1; two small discoidal spots; an oblique postmedial maculate white band, the spots between veins 5 and 3 and at inner margin small and the spot below vein 3 lunulate; a subterminal series of white spots, the spot below vein 7 displaced towards termen; cilia with a series of white spots. Hindwing semihyaline white, the basal and inner areas tinged with brown; a black discoidal spot, small subapical spot and slight subterminal points between veins 6 and 4; the underside with obliquely placed antemedial blackish spots below costa and in cell, a spot on costa above the discoidal spot.

Wingspan 54 mm.

References

 Lophocampa affinis at BOLD
 Lophocampa affinis at BHL
 

Moths described in 1909
affinis
Arctiinae of South America